Assane Diallo (born 10 February 1975) is a Senegalese runner who specializes in the 800 metres.

Diallo finished eighth in 4 x 400 metres relay at the 1999 World Championships, together with teammates Ousmane Niang, Ibou Faye and Ibrahima Wade.

On the individual level, Diallo won a bronze and a silver medal at the Jeux de la Francophonie in 1997 and 2005 respectively. His personal best time is 1:45.11 minutes, achieved in August 1999 in Montauban.

External links

1975 births
Living people
Senegalese male middle-distance runners
World Athletics Championships athletes for Senegal